Belmont is a suburb of Auckland, New Zealand. The name Belmont, which means "good view or hill", derives from a farm estate called "Belmont" which was subdivided in 1885. The suburb is in the North Shore ward, one of the thirteen administrative divisions of Auckland Council.

Demographics

Belmont had a population of 3,027 at the 2018 New Zealand census, an increase of 81 people (2.7%) since the 2013 census, and an increase of 219 people (7.8%) since the 2006 census. There were 1,056 households, comprising 1,473 males and 1,554 females, giving a sex ratio of 0.95 males per female. The median age was 35.4 years (compared with 37.4 years nationally), with 645 people (21.3%) aged under 15 years, 645 (21.3%) aged 15 to 29, 1,329 (43.9%) aged 30 to 64, and 405 (13.4%) aged 65 or older.

Ethnicities were 74.7% European/Pākehā, 8.7% Māori, 4.2% Pacific peoples, 19.0% Asian, and 4.5% other ethnicities. People may identify with more than one ethnicity.

The percentage of people born overseas was 38.7, compared with 27.1% nationally.

Although some people chose not to answer the census's question about religious affiliation, 56.9% had no religion, 31.9% were Christian, 0.1% had Māori religious beliefs, 1.3% were Hindu, 0.7% were Muslim, 2.4% were Buddhist and 1.9% had other religions.

Of those at least 15 years old, 903 (37.9%) people had a bachelor's or higher degree, and 201 (8.4%) people had no formal qualifications. The median income was $42,100, compared with $31,800 nationally. 666 people (28.0%) earned over $70,000 compared to 17.2% nationally. The employment status of those at least 15 was that 1,269 (53.3%) people were employed full-time, 318 (13.4%) were part-time, and 69 (2.9%) were unemployed.

Education
Takapuna Grammar School is a secondary (years 9–13) school with a roll of  students. The school was built in 1926 and opened the following year. The adjacent Belmont Intermediate is an intermediate (years 7–8) school with a roll of 518.

It was founded in 1912 and moved to its current siate in 1913.

Wilson School is a special school for students with intellectual or physical disabilities. It has a roll of  students. It was previously called the Wilson Home.

All these schools are co-educational. Rolls are as of

Notes

External links
 Takapuna Grammar School website
 Belmont Intermediate website
 Belmont School website
 Wilson School website
Photographs of Belmont held in Auckland Libraries' heritage collections.

Suburbs of Auckland
North Shore, New Zealand
Populated places around the Waitematā Harbour
Populated places around the Hauraki Gulf / Tīkapa Moana